Eupithecia skoui is a moth in the family Geometridae that is endemic to Thailand.

The forewings are dirty white and the hindwings are pale dirty white.

References

Moths described in 2009
Endemic fauna of Thailand
Moths of Asia
skoui